Nitrolysis is a chemical reaction involving cleavage ("lysis") of a chemical bond concomitant with installation of a nitro group (NO2).  Typical reagents for effecting this conversion are nitric acid and acetyl nitrate.  A commercially important nitrolysis reaction is the conversion of hexamine to nitramide. Nitrolysis of hexamine is also used to produce RDX, (O2NNCH2)3, a trinitramide widely used as an explosive.

References

Chemical reactions
Nitration reactions